Alfonso XI (13 August 131126 March 1350), called the Avenger (el Justiciero), was King of Castile and León. He was the son of Ferdinand IV of Castile and his wife Constance of Portugal. Upon his father's death in 1312, several disputes ensued over who would hold regency, which were resolved in 1313.

Once Alfonso was declared an adult in 1325, he began a reign that would serve to strengthen royal power. His achievements include the victory in the Battle of Río Salado over Granadans and Marinids and the Castilian control over the Strait of Gibraltar.

Life

Minority

Born on 13 August 1311 in Salamanca, he was the son of King Ferdinand IV of Castile and Constance of Portugal. His father died when Alfonso was one year old. His grandmother, María de Molina, his mother Constance, his granduncle Infante John of Castile, son of King Alfonso X of Castile and uncle Infante Peter of Castile, son of King Sancho IV assumed the regency. His mother died first on 18 November 1313, followed by Infantes John and Peter during a military campaign against Granada in 1319 at the Disaster of the Vega, which left Dowager Queen María as the only regent until her death on 1 July 1321.

Alfonso inherited the throne at a time of instability within the region, decline in populations, reductions in the royal treasury and increasingly ambitious regents caused numerous problems during his young reign.

After the death of the Infantes John and Peter in 1319, Philip (son of Sancho IV and María de Molina, thus brother of Infante Peter), Juan Manuel (the king's second-degree uncle by virtue of being Ferdinand III's grandson) and Juan the One-eyed (his second-degree uncle, son of John of Castile who died in 1319) split the kingdom among themselves according to their aspirations for regency, even as it was being looted by Moors and the rebellious nobility.

A 14th century chronicle mentioned his appearance as "...King Alfonso was not very tall but well proportioned, and he was rather strong and had fair skin and hair."

Majority
His effective reign began in August 1325 when he was sworn in as king as he was proclaimed to have reached the age of majority in the Cortes of Valladolid. Following a ritual that took him to Santiago de Compostela and to the monastery of Las Huelgas in Burgos, his self-crowning took place in 1332.

As soon as he took the throne, he began working hard to strengthen royal power by dividing his enemies. His early display of ruthless rulership skills included the unhesitant execution of possible opponents. Alfonso XI ordered the assassination of his uncle Juan the One-eyed in Toro in the 1326 eve of the feast of All Saints, along with two of the latter's knights, luring the former with promises of reconciliation.

He managed to extend the limits of his kingdom to the Strait of Gibraltar after the important victory at the Battle of Río Salado against the Marinid dynasty in 1340 and the conquest of the Kingdom of Algeciras in 1344. Once that conflict was resolved, he redirected all his Reconquista efforts to fighting the Moorish king of Granada.

During his reign a political reform in the municipal government took place, with the substitution of the concejos abiertos by the regimientos. He fostered the issuance of cartas pueblas as strategy for the demographic strengthening in the borderland areas.

He is variously known among Castilian kings as the Avenger or the Implacable, and as "He of Río Salado." The first two names he earned by the ferocity with which he repressed the disorders caused by the nobles during his long minority; the third by his victory in the Battle of Río Salado over the last formidable Marinid invasion of the Iberian Peninsula in 1340.

Alfonso XI never went to the insane lengths of his son Peter of Castile, but he could be bloody in his methods. He killed for reasons of state without any form of trial. He openly neglected his wife, Maria of Portugal, and indulged a scandalous passion for Eleanor of Guzman, who bore him ten children.

Infected by the Black Death during the 1349–1350 siege of Gibraltar, Alfonso died in the night of 25–26 March 1350 (some sources put the date wrongfully at 27 March). The Castilian forces withdrew from Gibraltar, with some of the defenders coming out to watch. Out of respect, Alfonso's rival Yusuf I of Granada ordered his army and his commanders in the border regions not to attack the Castilian procession as it traveled with the king's body to Seville.

Marriage and issue
Alfonso XI first married Constanza Manuel in 1325, but had the union annulled two years later. His second marriage, in 1328, was to his double first cousin Maria of Portugal, daughter of Alfonso IV of Portugal. They had:
 Ferdinand (Valladolid, 1332–1333);
 Peter of Castile (1334–1369), King of Castile.

By his mistress, Eleanor of Guzmán, he had ten children:
 Pedro Alfonso (1330–1338), Lord of Aguilar de Campoo;
 Sancho Alfonso (1331–1343), 1st Lord of Ledesma;
 Henry II of Castile (1334–1379), King of Castile (1369–1379);
 Fadrique Alfonso (1334–1358), Henry's twin brother, he was Master of the Order of Santiago and Lord of Haro;
 Fernando Alfonso (1336–c. 1350), 2nd Lord of Ledesma;
 Tello Alfonso (1337–1370), Lord of Aguilar de Campoo;
 Juan Alfonso (1341–1359), Lord of Badajoz and Jerez de la Frontera;
 Juana Alfonso, (born 1342), Lady of Trastámara due to her marriage in 1354 to Fernando Ruiz de Castro. The marriage was annulled and in 1366 she married Felipe de Castro;
 Sancho Alfonso (1343–1375), 1st Count of Alburquerque;
 Pedro Alfonso (1345–1359)

After Alfonso's death, his widow Maria had Eleanor arrested and later killed.

Popular culture
He was depicted in the 1802 play Alfonso, King of Castile by the British writer Matthew Lewis. It was first staged at London's Covent Garden Theatre with Charles Murray in the title role.

Ancestry

Notes

References

 
 Chapman, Charles Edward and Rafael Altamira, A history of Spain, The MacMillan Company, 1922.

 
 
 
 
 
 
 
 Medieval Iberia: an encyclopedia, Ed. E. Michael Gerli and Samuel G. Armistead, Routledge, 2003.

1311 births
1350 deaths
14th-century Castilian monarchs
People from Salamanca
Castilian House of Burgundy
14th-century deaths from plague (disease)
Medieval child monarchs
Castilian infantes